Saint Petersburg has long been a leading center of science and education in Russia and houses the following institutions:

Universities and tertiary institutions
 Russian Academy of Sciences (1724)
 Saint Petersburg State University (founded 1724)
 Russian State Pedagogical University (Herzen University) (founded 1797)
 Saint Petersburg Naval Academy (founded first decade of the 18th century)
 Vaganova Academy of Russian Ballet (1738)
 Imperial Academy of Arts (founded 1757)
 Saint Petersburg Medical-Surgical Academy (founded 1798)
 Saint Petersburg Mining Institute (Горный институт) (founded 1773)
 Saint Petersburg Military engineering-technical university (1810)
 Saint Petersburg State Institute of Technology (1828)
 Pulkovo Observatory (1839)
 Ivan Pavlov's Medical Academy and research center. (founded 1880s)
 Saint Petersburg Conservatory (1862)
 Alexander Military Law Academy (founded 1867)
 Saint Petersburg Academic University (2002)
Saint Petersburg Medical and Technical Institute
 Saint Petersburg State Transport University (1809)
 Saint Petersburg State Electrotechnical University (1886)
 Saint Petersburg State Medical University (1897)
 Saint Petersburg Polytechnical University (1899)
 Saint Petersburg State University of Water Communications (1809)
 State Marine Technical University (1899)
 Saint Petersburg State Theatre Arts Academy (former Tenishev's College) (1899)
 Saint Petersburg State University of Information Technologies, Mechanics and Optics (1900)
 Pushkin House (1905)
 Pushkin Leningrad State University (1992)
 St. Petersburg State University of Technology and Design 
 Saint Petersburg State Medical Academy (1907)
 St. Petersburg State University of Telecommunications (1930)
 Saint-Petersburg State University of Aerospace Instrumentation (1941)
 Saint Petersburg Pharmaceutical Academy
 Saint Petersburg Academy of Pediatrics and Maternity (founded 1900)
 St. Petersburg State University of Film and Television
 Saint Petersburg State University of Culture and Arts (1918)
 Saint Petersburg State Pediatric Medical Academy (1925)
 Saint Petersburg State University of Economics (1930)
 Baltic State Technical University (1932)
 Saint Petersburg Aerospace University (Mozhaysky University)
 Vavilov Institute of Plant Industry
 Admiral Makarov Maritime Academy
 St. Petersburg Christian University (1990)
 European University at Saint Petersburg (1994)
 Smolny College (1999)
 Saint Petersburg State University of Civil Aviation (founded 1955)
 Saint Petersburg University of Architecture and Civil Engineering (1832)

Primary and secondary schools

International schools serving foreign expatriates:
 Anglo-American School of St. Petersburg
 Deutsche Schule Sankt Petersburg (German school)
 École française André-Malraux (French school)
 International Academy of St. Petersburg, Russia

Higher education
Saint Petersburg